Dunlap House may refer to:

Charles H. Dunlap House, Phoenix, Arizona, listed on the National Register of Historic Places (NRHP)
Dunlap House (Clarksville, Arkansas), NRHP-listed
Catlin Wilson House (237 Wilson Avenue, Eutaw, Alabama), also known as the Murphy Dunlap House, NRHP-listed
Daniel R. Wright House (501 Pickens Street, Eutaw, Alabama), also known as the Murphy-Dunlap House, NRHP-listed
Dunlap's Dining Room, Sacramento, California, NRHP-listed
Munroe-Dunlap-Snow House, Macon, Georgia, NRHP-listed in Bibb County
John Dunlap House, Brunswick, Maine, NRHP-listed
Stuart Dunlap House, Mandan, North Dakota, NRHP-listed
William K. Dunlap House, Troy, Ohio, listed on the NRHP in Miami County
William B. Dunlap Mansion, Bridgewater, Pennsylvania, NRHP-listed
C.K. Dunlap House, Hartsville, South Carolina, NRHP-listed
Adam Dunlap Farmstead (Mazomanie, Wisconsin) — listed on the NRHP in Dane County